USS Garnet (PYc-15) was a coastal patrol yacht in the service of the United States Navy.

Garnet (PYc-15), formerly steel diesel yacht Caritas, was built in 1925, by Krupp Iron Works, Kiel, Germany; purchased 1 December 1941, from Mr. J. Perch Bartram of New York; converted to a coastal patrol yacht by Robert Jacobs Co., Inc., New York; commissioned 4 July 1942.

World War II Service 
Garnet departed New York 21 July 1942, for brief operations in Chesapeake Bay. After shakedown off Key West and Miami, Florida, she steamed via the Bahamas and the Panama Canal to San Diego, California, arriving 22 September. After coastal patrol off southern California, she departed San Diego, 2 December, for the Hawaiian Islands, arriving Pearl Harbor 15 December.

Except for an escort mission to Funafuti, Ellice Islands, in November 1943, Garnet spent the remainder of World War II on convoy escort and patrol duty between Pearl Harbor and Midway.

She returned to San Pedro, 15 November, and decommissioned there 29 December 1945. She was delivered to the Maritime Commission for disposal 20 February 1947, and was sold 10 June, to Mr. I. W. Lambert, Baltimore, Md.

Post-war
After the war Caritas was decommissioned 29 December 1945, at San Pedro, and taken to her current location at Smith River, California, as a roadside attraction and gift shop for the Best Western Ship Ashore Motel, now the independent Ship Ashore Resort.

References

External links 

Patrol vessels of the United States Navy
Patrol vessels of the United States
World War II patrol vessels of the United States
Ships built in Kiel
1925 ships